Nenad Vidović (born 5 May 1939) is a Yugoslav gymnast. He competed in eight events at the 1964 Summer Olympics.

References

1939 births
Living people
Yugoslav male artistic gymnasts
Olympic gymnasts of Yugoslavia
Gymnasts at the 1964 Summer Olympics
Place of birth missing (living people)